Spectator Magazine was an American weekly newsmagazine published and distributed in the San Francisco Bay Area from 1978 until October 2005. The magazine had its historical roots in the ‘60s underground weekly, The Berkeley Barb, first published on August 13, 1965. In addition to political free speech issues, the libertarian values of Barb founder Max Scherr and staff included sexual freedom, which led to the acceptance of adult ads into the pages of the newspaper. In 1978, The Barb management decided to discontinue adult ads in order to try to get mainstream ads, such as liquor, and cigarette ads. The staff of the Adult Ads Center Section decided to continue on as a new and separate publication, and thus Spectator Magazine was born. The last Berkeley Barb was published July 3, 1980 when the publication went under due to a lack of ads revenues.

Spectator Magazine could be identified in the early ‘80s by its mostly uncensored ads, a light-hearted approach to sex and a perspective on sexuality which embraced diversity, accepting all forms of consensual adult sex as valid. Editor Dave Patrick contributed cover model layouts, nude beach reports, and event photography.

In the mid-‘80s, in response to national waves of repression and censorship, including anti-porn feminist protests and “The Meese Commission Report on Pornography,” Spectator added more in-depth reporting and editorial commentary in an effort to fill a gap left by mainstream newspaper coverage of sexual issues.  By the late 1980s, an elite cadre of local freelance contributors joined this purpose, most notably David Steinberg, Carol Queen, Patrick Califia, Midori and Bill Henkin.

Also in the Eighties, staffers Miki Demarest, Kat Sunlove and Layne Winklebleck were instrumental, along with the ACLU and Californians Against Censorship Together (CAL-ACT!) in helping defeat one of the key provisions of a California bill (SB5), which would have changed statewide standards to local community standards in the legal definition of obscenity.

In 1987, the City of Alameda sought to ban Spectator news racks from their streets using a legal strategy based on the Renton v Playtime Theatres case, in which the Supreme court allowed the city of Renton to ban adult theaters within 1000 feet of residential areas. City Attorney Carter Stroud claimed news racks could be zoned in the same way. Spectator Magazine, again with the help of the ACLU and CAL-ACT, fought the Alameda ordinance, winning at the trial level in the courtroom of Alameda County Superior Court Judge Joseph Karesh, and in the California Court of Appeals (Sebago v City of Alameda).

Perhaps spooked by the high profile legal fight and media coverage, Sebago, Inc., in 1987, offered to sell Spectator Magazine to the employees. Eight staffers accepted the offer, forming a new corporation (Bold Type, Inc). Then Display Ad Manager and advice columnist Kat Sunlove was elected as CEO and President of the new corporation.  Business manager Miki Demarest served as Publisher. Layne Winklebleck and Dave Patrick shared editorial and photographic duties as “Rational” and “Renegade” Editors, respectively.

In 1992 Demarest left the paper and Sunlove moved into the Publisher role. With the growth of advertising from phone sex ads along with Sunlove’s high profile in the San Francisco sex community, the paper grew from $600K to over $1 million in annual gross revenues in the next three years, and enjoyed a positive profile in the Bay Area sex communities.  For example, in 1995 the paper produced a gala birthday celebration for Sunlove’s fiftieth birthday at the Great American Music Hall in San Francisco. The event drew crowds and celebrity performers from all over the nation, raising some $6000 for three charities, Feminists for Free Expression, and Bay Area groups: Cal-ACT (California Against Censorship Together) and Cal-PEP (Prostitutes Education Project).

Spectator Magazine’s halcyon period spanned a few more years despite challenges, the most serious among them a law passed by the California Legislature in 1994 that established penalties for the distribution of so-called “harmful matter” to minors. Unsupervised news rack distribution of such material was pointedly included in the new law. Sunlove formed a coalition of publications impacted by the law and hired famed First Amendment attorney Stanley Fleishman, who challenged the law in a trial and on appeal in the U.S. Ninth Circuit, where the law was upheld. This process took several years, during which the law was on hold. Finally, in March,1997, the Supreme Court refused to hear the case and it went into effect.

The harmful matter law includes the possibility of jail time for publishers. Not coincidentally, Sunlove moved from her Publisher role to that of lobbyist for the Free Speech Coalition, the trade association of the adult industry, leaving Winklebleck in the role of General Manager and Editor in Chief.

To cope with the law, Spectator began publishing two versions, an R-rated version (covered nipples) for street racks, and an X-rated version for stores. The high cost of such duplicate publishing posed a challenge for the company. Spectator Magazine also faced many of the same problems other print publications faced during this period, competition from Internet competitors, rising costs of paper and traffic gridlock. In addition, widespread news rack vandalism, beginning in 1997, added substantial expenses.

In 2002, seeing the writing on the wall for the imminent financial collapse of Bold Type, Inc, Winklebleck and Sunlove (along with several other shareholders) sold their shares of the business to Dara Lynne Dahl, an exotic dancer and prostitute, and W. Vann Hall, a photographer and amateur software developer. These new shareholders hoped to revamp Spectator content and restore profitability. However, due to their lack of managerial talent and general ineptitude, the structural problems only got worse.

In April, 2002, David Moreno, the owner of a sex tabloid, Yank, began legal action against Spectator, claiming that Spectator employees had vandalized Yank news racks, constituting “unfair competition.” Spectator countersued, having long suspected that Yank employees were behind the vandalism of Spectator racks.

Thus began a lengthy and exhausting  legal battle, testing the magazine’s new owners. In 2004, San Mateo County Superior Court Judge Carl. W. Holm ruled in Spectator’s favor in all aspects and ordered Moreno to pay court costs and Spectator attorney fees.

In 2003, W Vann Hall removed himself from all operational and management functions, leaving Dahl in executive control. Her preference for partying distracted her from the fundamental business operations, such that more than 70% of advertisers left, the circulation plummeted from 25,000 copies a week to less than 5,000, and repeated failures to pay the necessary fees and taxes led to both the business license and the corporate status being cancelled.

Dahl left the paper to move to the United Kingdom putting her beyond easy reach of US authorities. Before leaving she found a new investor, Terry Hall, someone with over 20 years of global experience in executive management. Sadly, Dahl presented inaccurate information to Hall regarding the financial health of the company, and withheld critical data such as Bold Type's lack of business license and live corporate status. In essence the company was functionally insolvent. Not one to balk at a challenge, despite being defrauded, Hall threw his talents and his money into an effort to return Spectator Magazine back to its halcyon days. New staff were hired, community engagement was significantly increased, distribution and circulation rose, but the damages caused by the ineptitude of the prior management was too great to be overcome in a financially viable way. With great regret, in October, 2005 Hall closed Spectator Magazine down.

See also 

 Sebago, Inc. v. City of Alameda (1989)

References

External links
 Spectator.net, from the Internet Archive
 Spectatormag.com, from the Internet Archive

Alternative weekly newspapers published in the United States
Newspapers published in the San Francisco Bay Area
BDSM literature
Publications established in 1978
Weekly newspapers published in California